Dimra was a small Arab village located  northeast of Gaza City in British Palestine. Ancient remains at the site attest to a long-time human settlement there; during the Mamluk era, the town was the home of the Bani Jabir tribe. It was depopulated during the 1948 Arab–Israeli War, and is now the site of Erez, a kibbutz in Israel.

History
 
Ancient remains found throughout the village, including marble and granite columns as well as pottery, attest to longtime settlement at the site. An  excavation  have found remains, including coins, dating  the sixth century CE, that is the Byzantine empire. Many potsherds, dating to the same period, indicates that a pottery workshop was located there at the time.

Mamluk period
Following the conquest of the Crusader states during the period of Mamluk rule (1270-1516 CE) over Greater Syria (Levant), Dimra was located on an eastward route which left the main Gaza-Jaffa highway at Beit Hanoun. According to Moshe Sharon, Dimra was a likely resting place for those travelling in the region due to  its natural, independent water supply.

Three pieces of a marble slab, deposited since 1930 in the Rockefeller Museum, and dated to 676 AH (1277 CE) commemorates the building of a mosque at Dimra at that year.

According to Walid Khalidi, Al-Qalqasandi, an Arab scholar (d. 1418 CE), wrote of Dimra, noting it was the home of the Bani Jabir, an Arab tribe.

Ottoman period
In 1838, during the Ottoman rule in Palestine, Edward Robinson passed by Dimreh, describing it as located  near the bend of a valley.

In 1863, French explorer Victor Guérin  found the village to have 120 inhabitants. He assumed the village had previously been larger, due to several empty houses there.  By the well he found one column made of grey granite, and five sections of columns made of grey-white marble. Cucumbers and watermelons were planted in the surrounding gardens. An Ottoman  village list from about 1870  found that the village had  a population of 198, in a total of  71  houses, though the population count included men, only.    

In 1883  the PEF's Survey of Western Palestine noted that the place was alternately called Tumrah and Beit Dimreh. On the north side there was a garden with a water well below it.

British Mandate of Palestine
The village expanded during the British mandate period, and houses were built eastward and southward. In the 1922 census of Palestine, conducted by the British Mandate authorities, Dumra  had a population of 251, all Muslims, increasing in the 1931 census  to 324, still all Muslim, in  100 houses.

In the 1945 statistics   Dimra had a population of 520, all Muslims,  with a total of 8,492  dunams of land, according to an official land and population survey.  Of this, 96 dunams were used for citrus and bananas, 388 dunams were for plantations and irrigable land, 7,412  for cereals, while 18  dunams were built-up land.  An elementary school opened in Dimra in 1946, with an initial enrollment of 47 students.

1948 War and aftermath
During the 1948 Arab-Israeli war, the women and children of Dimra were reportedly evacuated by the village men on 31 October, likely in response to the advance of the Israeli army.

Following the war the area was incorporated into the State of Israel and kibbutz Erez was founded in 1949 on part of the village site. The remaining structures of the village are described by Khalidi in All That Remains (1992):"Most of the village is fenced in and used as pasture. A crumbling stone water basin, concrete rubble from houses, and a destroyed well are nearly all that remain. A watering trough for cows has been placed on what appears to be a concrete fragment from a former house. The well is topped with an old, nonoperating water pump. More debris lies in a wooded portion of the site, near a Jewish cemetery. Some cactuses that formerly served as fences, as well as shrubs and thorny plants, grow on adjacent lands.

References

Bibliography

 
  (pp. 880–881)

External links
Welcome To Dimra
 Dimra, Zochrot
Survey of Western Palestine, Map 19:   IAA, Wikimedia commons 
Dimra from the Khalil Sakakini Cultural Center

District of Gaza
Arab villages depopulated during the 1948 Arab–Israeli War